Will Brooke is an American political staffer and a figure in the Jack Abramoff Indian lobbying scandal.

He worked as chief of staff to U.S. Senator Conrad Burns (R-Montana) from November 2000 until the end of 2003, when he quit "to resume his Bozeman law practice and be the statewide chief" for President George W. Bush's Montana re-election campaign, Burns said in December 2003.

In January 2001 Brooke went on a trip to Super Bowl XXXV in Tampa, Florida paid for (against House ethics rules) by Jack Abramoff's SunCruz Casinos. Also on the trip were Burns appropriations staffer Ryan Thomas, Tom DeLay staffers, and Bob Ney chief of staff Neil Volz.

Brooke and Volz then became members of "Team Abramoff" at Greenberg Traurig.

In December 2005, Brooke was working as a lobbyist for the Washington firm Ryan, Phillips, Utrecht & MacKinnon, with a lobbying office in Bozeman.

It was later reported that Brooke voluntarily met with federal investigators and the Department of Justice and disclosed all information related to the Super Bowl XXXV trip as well as his work with Abramoff's firm, Greenberg Traurig. During the course of the investigation, it was revealed that Brooke had confirmed in advance of the Super Bowl trip that the trip complied with Senate ethics rules. Brooke was never charged with any violation of Senate ethic rules or any federal law. He now owns and operates Brooke Law Firm, P.C., located in Bozeman, Montana.

Footnotes

External links
Scott McMillion, "Bozeman city manager, Clark Johnson takes chief of staff position with Burns," MATR.net, December 30, 2003. 
Susan Schmidt, "Tribal Grant Is Being Questioned. Senator Who Had Dealings With Lobbyist Abramoff Pushed for Award," Washington Post, March 1, 2005.
Bob Brigham, "Conrad Burns key figure in multiple investigations," Swing State Project, March 24, 2005.
Faith Bremner, "Democrats decry Burns' link to lobbyist," Great Falls Tribune, April 2, 2005: "Shortly after Congress awarded the grant, Burns' former chief of staff, Will Brooke, went to work for Abramoff."
Joshua Micah Marshall, "Burns and Abramoff .. The Early Days," TPM Cafe, August 11, 2005: "Back in 2001, Burns and his then Chief of Staff Will Brooke were looking for help fund-raising.  And they turned to Jack Abramoff, who, as those now-controversial ads in Montana revealed, helped steer $136,000 in to Burns' coffers during the 2001-2002 campaign cycle. ... Along the way, Brooke got introduced into the Abramoff-funded high life."
"DNC: Abramoff Scandal Burns Conrad, But Can't Keep Cheney Away," U.S. Newswire, August 15, 2005.
"Who Is Team Abramoff?" Washington Post, December 12, 2005.
Jennifer McKee, "Ex-Burns aide talking to feds in Abramoff investigation," Helena Independent Record, December 13, 2005.
Scott Crass, "Clouds Forming in Big Sky Country: Will Burns Get Burnt by Abramoff?" Politics Fodder, December 15, 2005.
Camden Easterling, "Developer submits bill for parking garage," Bozeman Daily Chronicle, December 17, 2005: "Brooke's work secured the $4 million Bozeman received in a federal transportation bill earlier this year."

Living people
People from Bozeman, Montana
People associated with the Jack Abramoff scandals
Political chiefs of staff
Montana Republicans
United States congressional aides
Year of birth missing (living people)